HMS Explorer was an experimental British submarine based on the captured German high test peroxide (HTP) powered U-boat U-1407. Built for speed trials, they were unarmed. Their HTP engines were essentially steam turbines, with the steam being generated by the interaction of HTP with diesel oil and a catalyst.

Explorer suffered from so many teething troubles that her first captain never took her to sea. When these initial problems were conquered, however, she turned out to be impressively fast, achieving submerged speeds of 25 knots (46.3 km/h), aided by her streamlined hull and retractable fittings.

Both Explorer and her sister ship were fitted with the latest underwater escape technology, including a one-man escape chamber, and equipped with up to date escape breathing apparatus.

Explorer and Excalibur were popularly known as the 'blonde' submarines because of their hydrogen peroxide oxidiser and they served a useful purpose as high-speed targets for the Royal Navy's anti-submarine forces. Their main use, however, was to finally prove that HTP was impractical as an air-independent propulsion system for submarine use. The HTP was carried in special bags outside the inner pressure hull, which were prone to exploding unexpectedly. Additionally, the engine room (which was not occupied while under way) would often be the scene of flames appearing on the top of the combustion chamber, and on at least one occasion the crew were forced to evacuate the pressure hull and stand on the upper casing to avoid fumes which had suddenly filled the boat. The HTP fuel proved to be so troublesome that the boats quickly became known as Exploder and Excruciator.

Although part of the 3rd Submarine Squadron, the two submarines tended to operate independently, accompanied by their own depot ship HMS Kingfisher and a fuel carrier, the converted water-carrier, Royal Fleet Auxiliary RFA Spabeck.

When the US Navy succeeded in designing a nuclear reactor suitable for submarine installation, the HTP project was abandoned, and Explorer and Excalibur were scrapped.

Bibliography

Explorer-class submarines
Ships built in Barrow-in-Furness
1954 ships
Cold War submarines of the United Kingdom